INBO can refer to:

 Research Institute for Nature and Forest
 International Network of Basin Organizations
 Indian National Biology Olympiad